Women Do Cry is a 2021 Bulgarian drama film written and directed by Vesela Kazakova and Mina Mileva, and starring Maria Bakalova, Vesela Kazakova, Bilyana Kazakova, Iossif Surchadzhiev and Ralitsa Stoyanova. Set in Sofia, the film depicts 19-year-old Sonja, who is diagnosed with HIV, and the women in her family who flock around and support her.

The film premiered at the 2021 Cannes Film Festival, where it competed in the Un Certain Regard section, and was also screened at the Glasgow Film Festival and South by Southwest. It was released in theatres in Bulgaria and France to positive critical reception.

Plot
A promising 19-year-old musician named Sonja learns that she’s contracted HIV. After she drops out of the music conservatory, Sonja is helped out by her practical sister Lora, who supports the family by working as a crane driver, and their hapless mom Anna. Sonja’s crisis brings together two generations of women: sisters and aunts who have experienced relentless misogyny, shaming, and homophobia in turn. The women also share the trauma of violence in their own family, which slowly resurfaces the more time they spend together, learning to speak out and to grieve.

Cast
 Maria Bakalova as Sonja
 Vesela Kazakova as Yoana
 Bilyana Kazakova as Veronica
 Iossif Surchadzhiev as The Father
 Ralitsa Stoyanova as Lora
 Dobriela Popova as Tina
 Katia Kazakova as Anna
 Rositza Gevrenova as Maria
 Siana Georgieva as Katerina
 Dragomir Kostadinov as Drago

Release
The film had its world premiere at the Cannes Film Festival in the Un Certain Regard section on 14 July 2021. Domestically, it was first screened on 15 September 2021 at Sofia Film Fest, and went on to screen at the Cork Film Festival on 7 November 2021, Glasgow Film Festival on 9 March 2022, and SXSW on 12 March 2022. The film was released theatrically in Bulgaria on 17 September 2021, and in France on 9 March 2022.

Reception
On the review aggregator website Rotten Tomatoes, the film has an approval rating of 73% based on 15 reviews, with an average rating of 5.8/10.

References

External links
 

2021 films
2021 drama films
2021 LGBT-related films
Bulgarian drama films
LGBT-related drama films
2020s Bulgarian-language films
Films set in Bulgaria